John Kirby Allen (1810 – August 15, 1838), was a co-founder of the city of Houston and a former member of the Republic of Texas House of Representatives.  He was born in Canaseraga Village, New York (the present day hamlet of Sullivan in the Town of Sullivan, New York). He never married. He died of congestive fever on August 15, 1838, and was buried at Founders Memorial Cemetery in Houston, Texas.

Early years 
When he was seven years old, John took his first job, as a bellboy in a hotel in Orrville (present day DeWitt, New York). Three years later, he started working as a clerk in a retail shop. At sixteen, he formed a partnership with a friend operating a hat store at Chittenango, New York, where his brother, Augustus Chapman Allen, was professor of mathematics. In 1827, John cashed in his interest in the hat store and followed his brother to New York City, where they were investors in H. and H. Canfield Company until 1832.  The brothers then moved to Texas.

In Texas 
The Allen brothers arrived first in Galveston, Texas and then moved to the small town of Saint Augustine. In 1833, John Allen and his brother associated with a group of entrepreneurs in Nacogdoches and started operating a business as land speculators.

During the Texas Revolution 
Instead of joining the army when the Texas Revolution started, John and his brother engaged in the business of keeping supply channels open.  At their own expense they outfitted a ship, the Brutus, for the purpose of protecting the Texas coast and assisting troops and supplies from the United States to arrive safely in Texas.

Nevertheless, some members of the Texas provisional government objected to the Allen brothers' activities, and there were rumors that they were engaged in privateering.  In January 1836, they sold the Brutus to the Texas Navy, and it became only the second ship in the fledgling Texas navy. John and Augustus Chapman Allen continued to raise money and operate as receivers and dispensers of supplies and funds for the war effort without charge. In spite of the brothers' services, gossip and censure were aimed at the Allens because they were not in the armed services.

In politics
On August 30, 1836, John Kirby Allen's candidacy for Representative of Nacogdoches County to the first Congress of the Republic of Texas was announced in the Telegraph and Texas Register. He was elected in September, and officially began his term on October 3. There, he served on the president's staff with the rank of major. It was during this political service that John and his brother Augustus founded the city of Houston. He also continued to operate a shipping business during this time, along with his partner, James Pinckney Henderson.

In Congress, John Allen successfully lobbied to have the newly founded city of Houston named as the capital of the Republic. This gave Houston the boost it needed to survive its first years of initial development.

On April 13, 1838, Allen was elected to the board of directors to the Galveston City Company, which was a stock company chartered by the Republic of Texas to found the City of Galveston.

Legacy

Several Houston landmarks, including Allen Parkway, Allen Center as well as Allen's Landing Park, immortalize the name of the city's founders.

He is buried at Founders Memorial Cemetery along with his mother and father as well as most of his siblings.

References

External links

Founders Memorial Park at The Political Graveyard
Gravesite of John Kirby Allen at Texas Heritage Society

American city founders
History of Houston
1810 births
1838 deaths
Republic of Texas politicians
1st Congress of the Republic of Texas
Politicians from Houston
People from Sullivan, New York
People from Onondaga County, New York